Ob' Bay  is a bay lying between Lunik Point and Cape Williams in Antarctica. Lillie Glacier Tongue occupies the east part of the bay. The bay was charted by the Soviet Antarctic Expedition (1958) and named after the expedition ship Ob' .

References 

Bays of Victoria Land
Pennell Coast